Senegalese tea culture is an important part of daily social life. The Senegalese tea-drinking custom is essentially similar to those of other countries in the West Africa region, such as Mali, Guinea, Gambia and Mauritania. In and around Senegal, tea is prepared and presented in an elaborate process, and known in the Wolof language as attaya, ataya or ataaya.

Making ataya

Sometimes made with mint, the drink is particularly served as a social occasion after meals, and it's the beverage that is typically offered to friends and visitors. Drinking attaya is seen to promote conversation and maintain friendship because it takes a long time to prepare properly. Indeed, some authors have referenced the act of making ataya as a form of practical relaxation along with meditation and yoga.

Senegalese-style attaya is served in three separate stages, called "the three concoctions":  
One cookbook of African recipes recommends serving the tea immediately with a generous amount of sugar:

The first glass has been described as having an intense sweetness that cancels out a strident tannic bitterness to give a shot that is almost narcotic in its effect.  The second glass is sweeter and the third is very sweet but much reduced in its bitterness because the same leaves are used to prepare all three glasses.

Words used in various ethnic languages to refer to the tea, the tiny metal teapot and the mint are typically borrowed from Arabic, pointing to the idea that Senegalese mint tea is of Moorish origin.

More than 80% of the population from 15 to 60 years of age drink tea. Studies have shown that due to the high concentration of fluoride in green tea, the practice may aid in preventing dental diseases, specifically dental caries.

In music
The cultural importance of Senegalese tea drinking was underlined in the song Ataya, a track on Ismaël Lô's 1986 album, Natt.

See also

 Senegalese cuisine

References

External links
Videos showing attaya tea drinking customs:
 A man demonstrates attaya ceremonial serving of tea. 
 Drinking attaya in Eastern Senegal, also showing the preparation of the tea over an outdoor charcoal fire.

Senegalese cuisine
Tea culture by country
Tea in Africa